The Cape elephant shrew (Elephantulus edwardii), also known as the Cape rock elephant-shrew, or Cape rock sengi, is a species of elephant shrew in the family Macroscelididae. It is endemic to South Africa, although it is a relatively common animal. Its natural habitat is rocky areas. Elephant shrews are not closely related to other species of shrews and to rodents such as mice. E. edwardii has been observed to be a non-flying mammal pollinator of the pagoda lily (Massonia bifolia). Elephant shrews are floral pollinators due to their largely insectivorous diet. Elephant-shrews are pollinators of Hyobanche atropurpurea. It uses its long slender tongue to feed on the pagoda lily's nectar while getting the lily's pollen on its long nose. E. edwardii is also a pollinator of Protea sulphurea.

References

Endemic fauna of South Africa
Elephant shrews
Mammals of South Africa
Mammals described in 1839
Taxonomy articles created by Polbot